Amy Anderson may refer to:
 Amy Anderson (comedian) (born 1972), Korean-American comedian and actress
 Amy Anderson (golfer) (born 1992), American professional golfer
 Amy Bishop Anderson (born 1965), a suspect in the University of Alabama in Huntsville shooting
 Sailor Mercury, a character in Sailor Moon, also known as Amy Anderson